St Martin in the Bull Ring is a Church of England parish church in the city of Birmingham, West Midlands, England. It is the original parish church of Birmingham and stands between the Bull Ring Shopping Centre and the markets.

The church is a Grade II* listed building. The current rector is Jeremy Allcock.

History

Original church

The present Victorian church was built on the site of a 13th-century predecessor, which was documented in 1263. The church was enlarged in medieval times and the resulting structure consisted of a lofty nave and chancel, north and south aisles and a northwest tower with spire.

Although no record indicates when the first clock appeared in Birmingham, in 1547 the King's Commissioners reported that the Guild of the Holy Cross were responsible "ffor keeping the Clocke and the Chyme" at a cost of four shillings and four pence a year at St Martin's Church. The next recorded mention of a clock is in 1613. The earliest known clock makers in the town arrived in 1667 from London.

In 1690, the churchwardens "dressed the church in brick". All was cased in brick with the exception of the spire.

John Cheshire rebuilt 40 feet of the spire in 1781, which was strengthened by an iron spindle running up its centre for a length of 105 feet. It was secured to the sidewalls at every ten feet by braces. In 1801, several metres from the top of the spire were replaced after they were found to have decayed. The tops of the four pinnacles surrounding the main spire were also rebuilt. By 1808, the spire had been struck by lightning three times.

In 1853, the brick casing was removed from the tower by Philip Charles Hardwick, who added the open-air pulpit. The church also contained an organ, the reedwork of which had been done by John Snetzler. However, the pipes were found to be ineffective due to their proximity to the church roof and walls.

In 1875, John Thackray Bunce published a book, History of Old St. Martin's, Birmingham, illustrated with paintings by Allen Edward Everitt.

Current church

In 1873, the church was demolished and rebuilt by architect J. A. Chatwin, preserving the earlier tower and spire. During the demolition, medieval wall paintings and decorations were discovered in the chancel, including one showing the charity of St Martin dividing his cloak with a beggar. Two painted beams were also found behind the plaster ceiling.

The exterior is built of rockfaced Grinshill stone. The interior is of sandstone with an open timber roof, which shows the influence of the great hammerbeam roof of Westminster Hall. The beams are decorated with fine tracery and end in large carvings of angels. The roof weighs 93 tons (94.5 tonnes), spans 22 ft (6.7m) over the 100 ft (30.4m) long nave and is 60 ft (18.2m) high.

The Victorian floor tiles are by Minton and display the quartered arms of the de Bermingham family.

Dimensions

Windows
The south transept has a Burne-Jones window, made by William Morris in 1875. This window was taken down for safe keeping the day before a World War II bomb dropped beside the church on 10 April 1941, destroying all remaining windows. The west window is a 1954 copy of the Henry Hardman 1875 window destroyed in the Blitz.

Gallery

Parish
The parish of St Martin’s was extensive, covering a large portion of modern Birmingham. As new churches were constructed, parts of the parish were reassigned as follows:

List of clergy

Bells
There were four bells in 1552, together with a clock and chime. Six bells were put up in 1682. It is known that in 1745 when John Wesley preached in the Bull Ring the bells were rung in an attempt to drown his voice.

In July 1758 the eight bells were replaced by a new peal of ten, tenor weight 35 long cwt (1778 kg), cast by the Whitechapel Bell Foundry. These were subsequently augmented to twelve in 1772.

The first broadcast of church bells change ringing was of St Martin's. This was broadcast before a Sunday evening service in May 1924. The bells were recast in 1928 and an additional semitone bell was added in 1953. The frame in which the bells were rehung dated from 1869 and trouble with the frame led to a scheme of total renovation in 1991.

A new peal of sixteen bells (tenor weight ) hung for ringing was installed, being the first time more than twelve bells had been installed as a change ringing instrument. Sixteen is an unusual number, five, six, eight, ten or at the most twelve would be typical: in 2008 only three rings of sixteen exist in the world.

Organ

The Guild of the Holy Cross at St. Martin's Church provided for an organist before the Reformation.

The church was presumably without an organ from the English Civil War as the churchwardens accounts read:

An organ was duly erected by 1725 and the case was by Thomas Swarbrick. This organ was removed or replaced in 1822. The case was then transferred to St. Alphege's Church, Solihull by Rev Charles Curtis who was Rector of St. Martin's and Rector of St. Alphege, Solihull.

In 1822 a new organ was installed by Thomas Elliot The organ was extended in 1855 by William Hill who provided pedal pipes of 2 octaves and 2 notes. He also revoiced the reeds and open diapason in the swell, and extended the swell organ to tenor c, enclosing it in a new Venetian swell-box. This organ was rebuilt by John Banfield & Son in 1875 and renovated and enlarged to 3 manuals and 40 stops by Banfield in 1883. In 1906 this was sold to St John's Church, Deritend.

The current pipe organ is by Harrison & Harrison and dates from 1906. Originally it was a three manual instrument on the north side of the chancel but in 1955 it was re-built as a four manual organ and moved to the north transept by John Compton. The opening recital was given by George Thalben-Ball on 30 March 1955. The specification of the organ can be found at the National Pipe Organ Register.

Since around 2004, St Martin's has abandoned the use of the organ for the Sunday 11.00am Service (now called The Crossing service; a Music in Worship Group leads the Service). It is still played at the Sunday 9.30am Holy Communion and for 6.00pm Choral Services.

Organists

 Barnabas Gunn 1740 – 1753 (jointly with St. Philip's)
 Richard Hobbs 1753 – 1771 (From St Martin's Church, Leicester)
 Joseph Harris 1771 – 1802 (formerly organist of St Laurence Church, Ludlow)
 William Bodell Taylor
 James Stimpson 1851 – 1857
 Walter Brooks 1857 – 1900 (formerly organist of St. Mary's Church, Atherstone)
 Williamson John Reynolds 1900 – 1920 (formerly organist of St Michael, Cornhill, afterwards organist of Church of the Holy Trinity, Stratford-upon-Avon)
 Richard Wassell 1920 – 1942 (afterwards organist of St. Alphege's Church, Solihull)
 Henry William Stubbington 1942 – 1947
 Norman Blake 1947–1949 (also Director of Music, Handsworth Grammar School)
 Geoffrey Fletcher ARCO 1949 -1982 (also Director of Music, George Dixon Grammar School)
 David Griffiths 1982 – 1985 (also Director of Music, King Edward VI Five Ways School)
 Richard Wardell 1986 – 1997
 Peter Churchill 1991 – 1997

References

External links

Church of St Martin in the Bull Ring
Birmingham City Council page on the church
Bellringing at St Martin's in the Bull Ring

Grade II* listed buildings in Birmingham
Birmingham
Rebuilt churches in the United Kingdom
Churches completed in 1873
19th-century Church of England church buildings
Birmingham